Osvaldo Farrés (January 13, 1903 – December 22, 1985) was a Cuban songwriter and composer best known for having written the songs "", "", "", and "".

Early life 
Farrés was born in 1903 in the small city of Quemado de Güines, Las Villas, Cuba.

Career
Although unable to read or write music, he became a prolific and world-renowned composer.  His songs include "Quizás, Quizás, Quizás", "Acércate Más", "Tres Palabras", "Toda Una Vida" and his own favorite "Madrecita" written in honor of his mother and sung to this day in Latin America on Mother's Day.

His songs have been performed and recorded by stars such as Doris Day, Nat King Cole, Natalie Cole, Eydie Gorme, Pedro Vargas, Raquel Bitton, Charles Aznavour, Luis Miguel, Maurice Chevalier, Sara Montiel, Olga Guillot, John Serry Sr., Cake and many others. Charlie Haden included Tres Palabras on his Grammy-winning 2001 album Nocturne.

Personal life
In 1962, Farrés and his wife, Fina del Peso Farrés, left Cuba.  They never returned. He died in West New York, New Jersey, in 1985.

References

External links 
 Osvaldo Farrés on imdb.com
 Osvaldo Farrés on worldcat.org
 Osvaldo Farrés - sound recordings of his boleros on archive.org

1903 births
1985 deaths
People from Quemado de Güines
Cuban composers
Male composers
Cuban songwriters
Male songwriters
20th-century male musicians
Cuban male musicians